Gomoa District is a former district that was located in Central Region, Ghana. Originally created as an ordinary district assembly in 1988. However on 29 February 2008, it was split off into two new districts: Gomoa West District (capital: Apam) and Gomoa East District (capital: Gomoa Afransi). The district assembly was located in the southeast part of Central Region and had Apam as its capital town.

History 
Gomoa District was mainly inhabited by the Akan-subgroup Fantes. The inhabitants were mainly farmers and fishermen.

Apam was the capital of Gomoa District. The native name for this region was “Apaa.” Most of the people living in Apam were engaged in the fishing industry, supplying the land-locked villages surrounding it with fish. There was also a vibrant salt industry in Apam, in which salt is got from the lagoon. There is a secondary school and a hospital that serves the people of Apam and the surrounding areas.

One of the main attractions in Apam is a fort built by the Portuguese, called Fort Patience.

The people of Apam celebrate the "Akwambo" festival.  Akwambo literally means "the making of a way". It is celebrated to mark the time when their ancestors made their way to Apam.

Sources 
 
 District: Gomoa District

References

Central Region (Ghana)

Districts of the Central Region (Ghana)